Piscatawaytown is the oldest neighborhood in Edison Township in Middlesex County, New Jersey. It was established in the 1660s as the original village in what was then within Piscataway Township. Piscatawaytown is centered around St. James Church and the Piscatawaytown Common, near the intersection of Plainfield and Woodbridge Avenues. The Piscatawaytown Burial Ground is one of the oldest recorded cemeteries in Middlesex County and maintained by the township.

Lenape and European contact
The Raritan were bands of the Lenape people living around the Raritan River and its bay, in what is now central New Jersey and Staten Island, New York.

Establishment and naming
Edison was settled New Englanders in the 17th century. In 1666, additional settlers from the Piscataqua River, the state boundary of New Hampshire and Maine moved to region, bringing the name. Other settlements included Quibbletown and Raritan Landing.

Municipal boundaries
In 1870 portions of adjacent Piscataway and Woodbridge were used to form Raritan Township on March 17, 1870. It was renamed Edison in the 1950s.

Historic area

The Proprietors of the Province of East New Jersey granted a tract of land for a burial ground and a town common on March 5, 1695. The village comprised a town hall, militia training ground, stockade, jail, church, burial ground and houses. Saint James Church was established in 1704 and the original structure built in 1724. The existing building is from 1836.

Considerable military activity and battles known as the Forage War took place during the Revolutionary War in the Piscatawaytown area in 1776 and 1777. The Post Road (now Woodbridge Avenue) was a main land artery for British communications and movement of supplies and troops. The British army used St. James Church as a barracks and a hospital from December 1776 to June 1777. 

A tornado that occurred in June of 1835 caused damage to many of the gravestones as well as Saint James Church.

Burial ground
There had been burials at the location before the granting of tract, with one readable gravestone dating from 1693.
 The oldest readable gravestone is that of the Hoopar brothers, aged 10 and 12, who died of mushroom poisoning. The brothers were buried in 1693. 

There are many veterans from various wars buried in the grounds. This includes British soldiers that had died in the Revolutionary War and were buried in a common grave in 1777 . The highest ranking veteran buried in the grounds is Brevet Major General Thomas Swords, a veteran of the Mexican War and Civil War, buried in 1886.

A ground-penetrating radar scan of the burial ground conducted in 2021 identified 98 graves in the southwest corner of the grounds which has been designated as the colored burial ground. Only 11 of those individuals have been identified. In total, there have been 1,815 burials identified as of 2015, with 1,494 of those burials having gravestones.

See also
:List of neighborhoods in Edison, New Jersey

References 

Neighborhoods in Edison, New Jersey
Piscataway, New Jersey
History of New Jersey
Unincorporated communities in Middlesex County, New Jersey
Unincorporated communities in New Jersey